Sir George Malcolm Thornton  (born 3 April 1939) is a British Conservative politician who served as the Member of Parliament (MP) for Liverpool Garston from 1979 to 1983, and for Crosby from 1983 to 1997.

Education
He was educated at Wallasey Grammar School and later attended Liverpool Nautical College.

Political career

Thornton was first elected to Parliament in the 1979 general election, winning the marginal seat of Liverpool Garston from Labour's Eddie Loyden. In the early 1980s, however, all seats were re-organised with the new boundaries set to come in at the next election. Liverpool Garston would lean strongly towards Labour, so Thornton sought a safer seat in Crosby, just outside Liverpool. However, following the death of Sir Graham Page in 1981, Shirley Williams, a former Labour Cabinet minister who had founded the centrist SDP a few months earlier, won the seat. That by-election had been held in the depths of Margaret Thatcher's unpopularity; however, after that the economy returned to growth and Britain won the Falklands War, so Thatcher called an election in 1983 which was a Tory landslide. Thornton regained the seat, while Eddie Loyden won a redrawn Garston for Labour.
However, by 1997, the Conservatives were again deeply unpopular and Thornton lost, by a surprisingly wide margin to Labour's Claire Curtis-Tansley.

In 2007, Sir Malcolm Thornton became the 4th and current Pro-Chancellor and Chairman of the Board of Governors for Liverpool John Moores University.

References 

 Times Guide to the House of Commons 1997

External links 
 

Living people
1939 births
Conservative Party (UK) MPs for English constituencies
UK MPs 1983–1987
UK MPs 1979–1983
UK MPs 1987–1992
UK MPs 1992–1997
Knights Bachelor
Members of Wirral Council
Members of the Parliament of the United Kingdom for Liverpool constituencies
Politicians awarded knighthoods